Barry Hunter (born 18 November 1968) is a former Northern Ireland international footballer, recently he works as a chief scout for Premier League club Liverpool.

Hunter was born in Coleraine, and made his name with Wrexham before transferring to Reading for £400,000. On ending his playing career at Portadown, he had a short spell as the caretaker-assistant manager at Swindon Town under Ady Williams. Williams and Hunter were replaced by Paul Sturrock and Kevin Summerfield.

He joined Premier League Blackburn Rovers as a senior scout in 2006. Responsible for team assessments and player recruitment. He was recruited by Norwich City Manager Glenn Roeder as the clubs chief scout in June 2008. 
In December 2008, Hunter moved to Manchester City as a Senior scout/ regional scouting manager.

In September 2012, Hunter moved to Liverpool as the club's chief scout.

In 2007 he achieved Certificate in Applied Management from Warwick University

In 2017 he completed the FA Level 5 for Technical Directors.

References

External links

1968 births
Living people
People from Coleraine, County Londonderry
Football managers from Northern Ireland
Association footballers from Northern Ireland
Crusaders F.C. players
Portadown F.C. players
Reading F.C. players
Rushden & Diamonds F.C. players
Manchester City F.C. non-playing staff
Liverpool F.C. non-playing staff
Rushden & Diamonds F.C. managers
Southend United F.C. players
Wrexham A.F.C. players
Northern Ireland international footballers
People educated at Coleraine Academical Institution
Association football defenders
Sportspeople from County Londonderry